Wandja Allan Tchaptchet (born 21 December 2001) is a French professional footballer who plays for Grenoble in French Ligue 2.

Club career
Tchaptchet joined Southampton in the summer of 2018 and signed his first professional deal in December 2018, committing to the club until June 2021. On 16 January 2021, he made the bench for senior game for the first time, remaining as an unused substitute in a defeat against Leicester City. On 2 February 2021, he made his senior debut, coming on as a substitute for the final 12 minutes in a 9–0 loss to Manchester United.

Tchaptchet left Southampton in July 2021 after failing to agree a new deal with the club.

Tchaptchet joined Grenoble in French Ligue 2 in January 2022. He was a free agent and signed a two and a half year deal at the Stade des Alpes.

International career
Born in France, Thchaptchet is of Cameroonian descent. He is a youth international for France.

Career statistics

Club

References

External links
 

2001 births
Living people
Sportspeople from Besançon
French footballers
France youth international footballers
French sportspeople of Cameroonian descent
French expatriate footballers
Premier League players
Jura Dolois Football players
AJ Auxerre players
Southampton F.C. players
Grenoble Foot 38 players
Association football defenders
French expatriate sportspeople in England
Expatriate footballers in England
Footballers from Bourgogne-Franche-Comté